Irene Zin Mar Myint (also spelt Irene Zin Ma Myint; born Zin Mar Myint; 29 August 1990) is a Burmese pop singer and best known for her Pop music. She gained recognition from competed in Melody World, a televised singing competition.

Early life and education
Irene was born on 29 August 1990 in Yangon, Myanmar to Burmese Jewish parents. Her mother and father was born in Yangon to Burmese-Jewish descent parents. She is the youngest daughter of four siblings, having three elder brothers, and one of her brothers, Leo Bo Bo is also a singer. She is a practicing Baptist. She attended the high school at BEHS 2 Sanchaung and graduated Eco from University of East Yangon in 2011.

Career
Irene started out on her music career in participated as a contestant in Melody World, a televised singing competition and gained recognition after competed, even she was not placed in the top 5. After she has competed in Melody World, she engaged in shooting commercial advertisements, stage performances, and many concerts at various locations throughout Myanmar. 

Irene started endeavoring to be able to produce and distribute a solo album. She launched her debut solo album Yein Lite in 2012 which spawned more huge hits. Many music industry records have followed since then. Her second album Chit Loh was released on 28 May 2017. The latter album was inspired by her experiences following the breakup of an eight-year relationship. She gained the Most Requested Song 2013 Award with Na Lone Thar A Yinn A Naee song, awarded by Shwe FM at 4th Anniversary Music Awards Ceremony in 2013.

Irene released her third album MAR at her 28th birthday on 29 August 2018.

Discography

Solo albums 

 Yein Lite (2012)
 Chit Loh (2017)
 MAR (2018)

Collaborative albums

Melody World Album (2008)
A Yin Tine Htet (2009)
A Chit Htet Ma Ka (2011)
Nan Yoe Paing Shin (2014)
ZPNI (2016)

See also 
 Music of Myanmar

References

External links

1990 births
Burmese Christians
21st-century Burmese women singers
Burmese singer-songwriters
Burmese people of Jewish descent
People from Yangon
Living people
Melody World participants